Josia Thugwane (born 15 April 1971) is a South African retired long-distance runner, best known for winning the gold medal in the marathon at the 1996 Summer Olympics. Thugwane, who is of Ndebele heritage, is the first black athlete to earn an Olympic gold for South Africa.

Born in Bethal, Thugwane ran his first marathon in 1991, but his breakthrough to the international athletics scene came in 1995, when he won the Honolulu Marathon.

Just five months before the Games commenced, Thugwane was carjacked and shot; the bullet grazed his chin, leaving an inch-long scar, and he injured his back as a result of jumping from his moving car. The coalmine that employed him paid for his medical care and rehabilitation.

At Atlanta, in the 1996 Olympic marathon, a large leading pack stayed in contact with each other for most of the race, until at the 35 km mark when Thugwane initiated a break away and he along with Lee Bong-Ju from South Korea and Erick Wainaina from Kenya. They stayed together until entering the stadium, when Thugwane got a slight lead. Thugwane finished three seconds ahead of Lee for the closest Olympic marathon finish ever.

Thugwane had a very successful year in 1997 by winning the Fukuoka Marathon and he won the AIMS Best Marathon Runner Award that year. After that point his career performance dipped. He failed to finish in three successive marathons, and finished only twentieth in the 2000 Sydney Olympic marathon despite top ten finishes in the New York Marathon and London Marathon that year. In 2002 he won the Nagano Olympic Memorial Marathon in Japan.

He was awarded the Silver Order of Ikhamanga, South Africa's second highest cultural honour, in 2011.

Statistics

International competition record

Professional races

National titles
South African Athletics Championships
Marathon: 1993, 1996

See also
List of 1996 Summer Olympics medal winners
List of African Olympic medalists
List of marathoners
List of Olympic medalists in athletics (men)
List of South African sportspeople
Marathons at the Olympics

References

External links 
 
 
 

1971 births
Living people
People from Bethal
South African male long-distance runners
South African male marathon runners
Olympic athletes of South Africa
Olympic gold medalists for South Africa
Olympic gold medalists in athletics (track and field)
Athletes (track and field) at the 1996 Summer Olympics
Athletes (track and field) at the 2000 Summer Olympics
Medalists at the 1996 Summer Olympics
Recipients of the Association of International Marathons and Distance Races Best Marathon Runner Award